Glyphipterix loricatella is a moth of the  family Glyphipterigidae. It is found in Hungary, Romania and Albania. In Hungary, the species has only been recorded from three localities in Budapest, and one slightly further north. The habitat consists of clearings in oak-shrub forest-steppe on calcareous ground.

References

Moths described in 1833
Glyphipterigidae
Moths of Europe